Kadma is a village in Khunti district of Jharkhand state of India

References

Villages in Khunti district